The Pan American Ice Hockey Tournament was a series of the international ice hockey tournament in the continents of North and South America. The full members of the International Ice Hockey Federation (IIHF) are Canada, Mexico and the United States, which participate in the IIHF World Championship. The associate members are Argentina and Brazil, which participate in the IIHF Inline Hockey World Championship. Jamaica is also an IIHF member, but it have not been quoted as potential participants. Several countries have not registered any ice hockey activities are Chile, Ecuador and Venezuela, have only played inline hockey.

History
The first edition took place in Mexico City from 2 to 9 March 2014. The Canada Selects won the men's tournament after defeating Mexico in the final and Colombia finished in third place. Canada "A" squad (the Sudbury Lady Wolves) won the women's tournament, with Mexico finishing second and Canada "B" squad made up of players from several teams in Ontario finishing third.

The second edition also took place in Mexico City from 3 to 7 June 2015, with Brazil, Colombia, two Argentine teams and two Mexican teams on the men's tournament and Argentina, Colombia, two Mexican teams and a team featuring Brazilian and Mexican players on the women's tournament. This time, Canada not invited. Chile, Ecuador, Morocco, the United States and Venezuela were said to be invited, but it didn't attend to call.

The third edition took place in Mexico City from 6 to 12 June 2016. Colombia won the men's tournament after defeating Mexico. Mexico finishing second for the third time in three tournaments. Mexico "A" won the women's tournament after defeating Argentina.

The fourth and final edition took place in Mexico City from 5 to 11 June 2017, with two Argentine teams, two Brazilian teams, two Colombian teams, two Mexican teams and for the first time, featuring Chile on the men's tournament. On the women's tournament, with Argentina, Colombia, two Mexican teams and for the first time, a new women's team featuring Brazil.

Results

Men's

Women's

Medal table

Men's

Women's

References

 
International Ice Hockey Federation tournaments
International sports championships in the Americas
Recurring sporting events established in 2014
Recurring sporting events disestablished in 2017